Salvatore Agnelli (1817–1874) was an Italian composer. He was born at Palermo, studied at the Naples Conservatory, under Furno, Zingarelli, and Donizetti.

Notes

References

 

1817 births
1874 deaths
Musicians from Palermo
Italian male composers
19th-century Italian composers
19th-century Italian male musicians